The 1911 Yale Bulldogs football team represented Yale University in the 1911 college football season. The Bulldogs finished with a 7–2–1 record under first-year head coach John Field.

Three Yale players, end Douglas Bomeisler, center Hank Ketcham and quarterback Art Howe, were consensus picks for the 1911 College Football All-America Team. Walter Camp's son, Walter C. Camp, Jr., played at the halfback position for the 1911 Bulldogs and received second-team All-America honors from his father and from Wilton S. Farnsworth.  Yale fullback Jesse Philbin also received first-team All-America honors from Farnsworth.

Schedule

References

Yale
Yale Bulldogs football seasons
Yale Bulldogs football